Alexandru Crețu (born 24 April 1992) is a Romanian professional footballer who plays as a defensive midfielder or a centre-back for Liga I club Universitatea Craiova.

Club career
Crețu came into prominence during the 2012–13 Liga I season, following his good performances as a central defender at CSMS Iași.

In December 2016, he signed a three-and-a-half-year contract with Slovenian team Olimpija Ljubljana. In February 2018, Crețu moved to domestic rivals Maribor with which he agreed to a three-and-a-half-year deal.

In the summer of 2021, he returned to Romania to sign for FCSB as a free agent. He however left the club before the end of August after falling out with owner George Becali.

International career
Crețu was a member of the Romanian under-21 youth team. On 4 September 2020, he debuted for the senior team in a 1–1 draw against Northern Ireland in the 2020–21 UEFA Nations League.

Career statistics

International

Honours
CSMS Iași
Liga II: 2011–12, 2013–14

Maribor
Slovenian PrvaLiga: 2018–19

References

External links

NZS profile 

1992 births
Living people
People from Pașcani
Romanian footballers
Association football midfielders
Association football defenders
Liga II players
Liga I players
Slovenian PrvaLiga players
FC Politehnica Iași (2010) players
CS Corvinul Hunedoara players
NK Olimpija Ljubljana (2005) players
NK Maribor players
FC Steaua București players
CS Universitatea Craiova players
Romania under-21 international footballers
Romania international footballers
Romanian expatriate footballers
Expatriate footballers in Slovenia
Romanian expatriate sportspeople in Slovenia